John Augustin Ortiz is an American actor. He is known for his antagonist role as Arturo Braga in Fast & Furious (2009) and Fast & Furious 6 (2013), and Clyde in Jack Goes Boating (2010), which earned him a nomination for the Independent Spirit Award for Best Supporting Actor. He is also an artistic director/co-founder of the LAByrinth Theater Company.

Ortiz's other film performances include Guajiro in Carlito's Way (1993), Sheriff Eddie Morales in Aliens vs. Predator: Requiem (2007), Javier J. Rivera in American Gangster (2007), Ronnie in Silver Linings Playbook (2012), Victor Nieves in Kong: Skull Island (2017), and Dr. Powell in Bumblebee (2018).

Personal life
Ortiz was born and raised in the Bushwick neighborhood of Brooklyn, New York; he is of Puerto Rican ancestry. He graduated from John Dewey High School in Brooklyn, where he met his wife. Ortiz resided in that borough with his wife Jennifer and son Clemente until 2010, when he and his family moved to California.

Career
In 1993, John made his film debut as Al Pacino's young cousin Guajiro in Carlito's Way. He has gone on to appear in over 30 films including El Cantante, Take the Lead, Before Night Falls, Amistad, Ransom, and Narc. His recent film performances include those in Michael Mann's Miami Vice as drug lord Jose Yero, Ridley Scott's American Gangster as Russell Crowe's partner Javy Rivera, and Travis Knight's Bumblebee as scientist Dr. Powell.

Among Ortiz's television roles, he has played the lead in J. J. Abrams’ Hope Against Hope for HBO, a series regular on Denis Leary's series The Job and CBS’s Clubhouse as well as the NBC cop drama Blue Blood, directed by Brett Ratner.

In 1992, Ortiz formed Latino Actors Base with 13 other Latino actors to provide themselves with a place to work and an opportunity to become a tightly knit ensemble. Today, that ensemble is known as LAByrinth Theater Company: an award winning troupe of over 100 artists from a wide range of cultural backgrounds and creative disciplines.

With LAByrinth, he played the role of Clyde in the world premiere of Jack Goes Boating by Bob Glaudini (Drama Desk nomination). In 2006, he appeared as Che Guevara in the world premiere of School of the Americas by Jose Rivera, a co-production between LAByrinth Theater Company and The Public Theater. Other co-productions between LAByrinth and the Public include the role of Jesus in the world premiere of The Last Days of Judas Iscariot by Stephen Adly Guirgis, and José Solo in Guinea Pig Solo by Brett C. Leonard. Other LAByrinth Theater credits include Jesus Hopped the A Train by Stephen Adly Guirgis in London and New York (Drama Desk nomination, Drama League Award) and Where's My Money? written and directed by John Patrick Shanley.

In 2003, Ortiz made his Broadway debut in Nilo Cruz’ Pulitzer Prize winning play Anna in the Tropics. He appeared in three world premiere plays by José Rivera: The Adoration of the Old Woman at La Jolla Playhouse, Sueño at MCC Theater and The Street of the Sun at Mark Taper Forum. He was also featured in two New York premieres of Rivera's plays: References to Salvador Dalí Make Me Hot at the Public Theater (OBIE Award) and Cloud Tectonics at Playwrights Horizons. Ortiz also appeared in The Skin of Our Teeth and De Donde at the Public Theater; the world tours of The Merchant of Venice and The Persians directed by Peter Sellars; House Arrest at Arena Stage; and the national tour of A Few Good Men; Pentecost at Yale Repertory Theatre.

Recent projects
He appeared in the feature films Aliens vs. Predator: Requiem, Pride and Glory, Public Enemies and Fast & Furious, and Jack Goes Boating, directed by Philip Seymour Hoffman, in January 2009. In Summer 2009, he starred on stage in Othello at the Vienna Festival. Beginning in December 2012, he appeared as Jackie in the Stephen Adly Guirgis play The Motherfucker with the Hat at Chicago's Steppenwolf Theatre Company. He also co-starred in Silver Linings Playbook.

Filmography

Film

Television

References

External links

 
 Lab Theater: John Ortiz

American male film actors
Living people
American male stage actors
American male television actors
Hispanic and Latino American male actors
Male actors from New York City
American people of Puerto Rican descent
John Dewey High School alumni
University at Albany, SUNY alumni
20th-century American male actors
People from Bushwick, Brooklyn
21st-century American male actors
1968 births